The 2021 season for  was its sixth season as a UCI WorldTeam and its 15th overall. After last year's title sponsor, Japanese telecommunications company NTT, decided not to renew their contract with the team, South African bicycle charity organization Qhubeka, a former title sponsor, and Swiss clothing brand Assos stepped up to sponsor the team for two seasons. However, before the new sponsors were announced, the sponsorship crisis led to many riders seeking contracts with teams elsewhere, resulting in the departure of 19 of the 29 riders on the team last season.

Prior to the Tour de France, cryptocurrency investment company NextHash Group became the team's co-title sponsor as part of a five-year sponsorship deal, and the team rebranded as Team Qhubeka NextHash.

However, despite finding a sponsor mid-season again, the team faced financial problems. In December 2021, the UCI announced that the team would not receive a UCI WorldTour license for 2022. The team then announced they would continue at the UCI Continental level with the development team and hoped to return to the WorldTour in the future.

Team roster 

Riders who joined the team for the 2021 season

Riders who left the team during or after the 2020 season

Season victories

References

External links 
 

Team Qhubeka Nexthash
2021
Team Qhubeka NextHash